Rajguru, also spelled as Rajyaguru,  is an ancient title and surname of the Indian subcontinent which means royal priest. 

Another meaning based on the references of Rajgurus in various ancient texts, is someone who advised the King on matters of governance to keep it aligned to dharma or righteousness as defined in ancient scriptures, Vedas.

Notable people 
Rajguru Aggavamsa Mahathera, Bangladeshi Buddhist
Rajguru Priyo Ratana Mahathera, Buddhist guru
Basavaraj Rajguru (1917–1991), Hindustani singer
Hari Rajguru (born 1939), Indian cricketer
Jayi Rajaguru (1739–1806), Indian independence activist
Prakash Rajguru (1939—2006), Indian cricketer
Rinku Rajguru (born c. 2000), Indian film actress
Satyanarayana Rajguru, Indian litterateur, epigraphist and historian
Shaktipada Rajguru (1922–2014), Indian Bengali writer
Shivaram Rajguru (1908–1931), Indian revolutionary

References 

Indian royal advisors